is a railway station operated by Kobe New Transit in Chūō-ku, Kobe, Japan. It is located on Port Island and is served by the Port Island Line. The station name is taken from the nearby Riken Advanced Institute for Computational Science.

The station was originally named . Following the decommissioning of K computer, the station was renamed to the current name on 19 June 2021.

Ridership

Adjacent stations

References

External links
  

Railway stations in Japan opened in 2006
Railway stations in Kobe